Alane Felsinger (born 10 July 1937) is a former Sri Lankan cricket umpire. He stood in one Test match, Sri Lanka vs. Pakistan in 1986. His brother Herbi was also an international umpire for Sri Lanka.

See also
 List of Test cricket umpires
 Pakistani cricket team in Sri Lanka in 1985–86

References

1937 births
Living people
People from Colombo
Sri Lankan Test cricket umpires